Donald Robertson (22 August 1930 – 5 September 1995) was a Scottish engineer turned scriptwriter who penned four episodes of Thunderbirds: "Edge of Impact", "Desperate Intruder", "Danger at Ocean Deep" and "Path of Destruction". Usually his stories revolved around machines and vehicles in peril.

Robertson wrote his scripts in a caravan parked at the end of his garden in Birmingham, finding it peaceful and quiet. His other TV work seemingly included Dr. Finlay's Casebook and Crossroads.

References

External links 

1930 births
1995 deaths
Scottish television writers